HMS Bedouin was a  destroyer of the British Royal Navy that saw service in World War II.

Description
The Tribals were intended to counter the large destroyers being built abroad and to improve the firepower of the existing destroyer flotillas and were thus significantly larger and more heavily armed than the preceding . The destroyers were powered by two Parsons geared steam turbines, each driving one propeller shaft using steam provided by three Admiralty three-drum boilers. The ships' complement consisted of 190 officers and ratings, although the flotilla leaders carried an extra 20 officers and men consisting of the Captain (D) and his staff.

The primary armament of the Tribal-class destroyers was eight quick-firing (QF) 4.7-inch (120 mm) Mark XII guns in four superfiring twin-gun mounts, one pair each fore and aft of the superstructure, designated 'A', 'B', 'X', and 'Y' from front to rear. The mounts had a maximum elevation of 40°. For anti-aircraft (AA) defence, they carried a single quadruple mount for the  QF two-pounder Mk II "pom-pom" gun and two quadruple mounts for the 0.5-inch (12.7 mm) Mark III machine gun. Low-angle fire for the main guns was controlled by the director-control tower (DCT) on the bridge roof that fed data acquired by it and the  rangefinder on the Mk II Rangefinder/Director directly aft of the DCT to an analogue mechanical computer, the Mk I Admiralty Fire Control Clock. Anti-aircraft fire for the main guns was controlled by the Rangefinder/Director which sent data to the mechanical Fuze Keeping Clock.

The ships were fitted with a single above-water quadruple mount for  torpedoes. The Tribals were not intended as anti-submarine ships, but they were provided with ASDIC, one depth charge rack and two throwers for self-defence, although the throwers were not mounted in all ships; Twenty depth charges was the peacetime allotment, but this increased to 30 during wartime.

Wartime modifications
Heavy losses to German air attack during the Norwegian Campaign  demonstrated the ineffectiveness of the Tribals' anti-aircraft suite and the RN decided in May 1940 to replace 'X' mount with two QF  Mark XVI dual-purpose guns in a twin-gun mount. To better control the guns, the existing rangefinder/director was modified to accept a Type 285 gunnery radar as they became available. The number of depth charges was increased to 46 early in the war, and still more were added later. To increase the firing arcs of the AA guns, the rear funnel was shortened and the mainmast was reduced to a short pole mast.

Construction and career 
Authorized as one of nine Tribal-class destroyers under the 1936 Naval Estimates, Bedouin was the second ship of her name to serve in the Royal Navy. The ship was ordered on 19 June 1936 from William Denny and was laid down on 13 January 1937 at the company's Dumbarton shipyard. Launched on 21 December, Bedouin was completed on 15 March 1938 and commissioned the previous day at a cost of £340,400 which excluded weapons and communications outfits furnished by the Admiralty.

She served in the Second Battle of Narvik, where she was slightly damaged, and in the 1941 commando raid on the Lofoten islands. Bedouin was hit by at least 12 six-inch rounds and near-misses from the cruisers and an aerial torpedo before sinking. A gunner manning a .5-inch (12.7 mm) quad machine gun mounting shot down the torpedo bomber which delivered the coup de grâce. Twenty-eight men from her complement were killed in action and 213 were taken as prisoners of war by the Italian Navy.

Notes

References

External links
 IWM Interview with survivor William Collins

 

Tribal-class destroyers (1936) of the Royal Navy
1937 ships
World War II destroyers of the United Kingdom
World War II shipwrecks in the Mediterranean Sea
Maritime incidents in June 1942
Destroyers sunk by aircraft
Ships sunk by Italian aircraft
Ships built on the River Clyde
Royal Navy ship names